Our Lady of Grace is a title of the Blessed Virgin Mary. It may also refer to:

England
A Roman Catholic church in Chiswick, London, England, in the Archdiocese of Westminster
Our Lady of Grace School (Prestwich), in Prestwich, Greater Manchester

Malta
Our Lady of Graces Chapel, Qrendi
Parish Church of Our Lady of Graces, Żabbar

United States
Our Lady of Grace (Encino), Encino, California
Our Lady of Grace Church (Stratford, Connecticut)
Our Lady of Grace Church (Reserve, Louisiana), listed on the NRHP in St. John the Baptist Parish, Louisiana
Our Lady of Grace School, Parkton, a school in Parkton, Maryland
Church of Our Lady of Grace (Hoboken, New Jersey), listed on the NRHP in New Jersey
Our Lady of Grace (Howard Beach), a Roman Catholic church in Howard Beach, New York
Our Lady of Grace Catholic Church (Greensboro, North Carolina)

Goa
Our Lady of Grace Church (Chorão Island)

See also
 Notre-Dame-de-Grâce, a neighbourhood in Montreal, Canada